Psychopannychia (Latin from Greek; literally "all-night-vigil of the soul") is the earliest theological treatise by John Calvin dating in Latin manuscript from Orléans, 1534. The tract opposes the mortalism or "soul sleep" taught by Anabaptists and other radical Protestants. Psychopannychia first appeared in print in Latin as Vivere apud Christum non dormire animis sanctos, Strasbourg, 1542, and then in French, in a translation not by Calvin, as Psychopannychie, Geneva, 1558.

References

External links
 Psychopannychia, Full text at monergism.org.

1534 books
16th-century Christian texts
16th-century Latin books
John Calvin
Calvinist texts
Christian theology books